The Master of the Greenville Tondo is the notname for an Italian painter who was active between ca. 1454 and 1513. He is named after a tondo in the Bob Jones University Museum & Gallery in Greenville, South Carolina.

He was probably from Tuscany or Umbria and was a follower of Pietro Perugino, according to art historians Federico Zeri and Everett Fahy. More than twenty works have been attributed to the painter.

Works
Madonna and Child with Angels, Bob Jones University Museum & Gallery
Adoration of the Christ Child by Mary and Joseph, Museum of Fine Arts in  St. Petersburg, Florida (this work is also known as the Jonas Nativity)
Madonna and Child with the young Saint John the Baptist and two angels, sold at Sotheby's in 2011 for $30,000
Altarpiece in the church of Santa Cristina in Pancole, Greve in Chianti
Madonna and Child with Two Angels, Ca' d'Oro, Venice
Saint Sebastian, Princeton University Art Museum
Saint Sebastian, New Jersey State Museum
Virgin Praying, current location unknown
Holy Family with Infant St. John the Baptist in a Landscape, Walters Art Museum

Notes

Greenville Tondo, Master of the
Italian Renaissance painters